Sanjeev Agarwal is an Indian politician and a member of the 18th Legislative Assembly of Uttar Pradesh representing Bareilly Cantonment of Uttar Pradesh. He is a member of the Bharatiya Janata Party and is also the State Co-treasurer of the party.

Personal life
Sanjeev Agarwal was born to Krishna Autar Agarwal and hails from Bareilly Cantonment of Uttar Pradesh. He is a postgraduate and did his Master of Commerce from Bareilly College in 1984. Agarwal is a businessman and a clearing and forwarding agent in HeidelbergCement India Ltd.

Political career
In the 2022 Uttar Pradesh Legislative Assembly election, Agarwal represented Bharatiya Janata Party as a candidate from Bareilly Cantonment constituency and went on to defeat Samajwadi Party's Supriya Aron by 9389 votes, succeeding own party member Rajesh Agarwal in the process.

References

1960s births
Living people
Bharatiya Janata Party politicians from Uttar Pradesh
Uttar Pradesh MLAs 2022–2027
Politicians from Bareilly
Year of birth missing (living people)